Joseph Gilpin Graham (1889–1968) was an English footballer who played in the Football League for Exeter City and Stockport County.

References

1889 births
1968 deaths
English footballers
Association football midfielders
English Football League players
Stockport County F.C. players
Exeter City F.C. players
New Brighton A.F.C. players